Michele S. Swanson is an American biologist who is a Professor of Microbiology at the University of Michigan. She has investigated the water-borne pathogen Legionella pneumophila. Swanson is interested in the metabolic cues that underpin the virulence of L. pneumophila and how it is transmitted to humans. She served as president of the American Society for Microbiology in 2018.

Early life and education 
Swanson grew up in Michigan, one of six children in her family. Her father was the first member of his family to attend university. Swanson spent her summer holidays playing sports at Michigan summer camps, where she played field hockey and softball. Swanson eventually earned her bachelor's degree at Yale University, where she worked as a counsellor for freshmen at Davenport College. Swanson was inspired by John Trinkaus to pursue a career in experimental biology. After graduating from Yale, Swanson joined Rockefeller University as a laboratory technician. She moved to Columbia University for her graduate studies, where she earned a master's degree in genetics under the supervision of Marian Carlson. Swanson joined the laboratory of Fred Winston at Harvard University where she completed her doctoral research on the interactions of various transcription factors with yeast. She was a postdoctoral researcher at Tufts Medical Center, where she first became interested in Legionella pneumophila.

Research and career 
In 1996, Swanson joined the faculty at the University of Michigan. Swanson has studied how Legionella pneumophila remains virulent in different environments. She identified that the pathogen alternates between different cell types, one which is highly replicative and another which is highly transmissible that is primed to invade naïve hosts. After extended periods of starvation, L. pneumophila forms a highly infectious form. Swanson showed that L. pneumophila achieves these distinct cell types by coupling cellular differentiation to the metabolic state. 

L. pneumophila can cause sporadic outbreaks of Legionnaires' disease. This was responsible for the Flint water crisis that started in 2014. Swanson has studied the mechanisms that permit L. pneumophila to persist in water, looking to create a microbiology based system to assess the safety of public water systems.

Academic service 
Swanson serves as the director of postgraduate studies and President's Advisory Commission on Women's Issues at the University of Michigan. She was elected president of the American Society for Microbiology in 2018 and hosts the ASM podcast This Week in Microbiology. She was elected Fellow of the American Association for the Advancement of Science in 2019.

Selected publications

References 

American biologists
American women scientists
People from Michigan
Yale University alumni
Columbia University alumni
Harvard University alumni
University of Michigan faculty
American podcasters
Fellows of the American Association for the Advancement of Science
Presidents of the American Society for Microbiology
Year of birth missing (living people)
Living people
American women academics
American women podcasters
21st-century American women